The Uruguayan Rugby Union is the governing body for rugby union in Uruguay.

Foundation and affiliation

It was founded in 1951 and became affiliated to the International Rugby Board in 1989. 

They have been represented in the 1999, 2003 and 2019 Rugby World Cups.

Presidents

See also
Rugby union in Uruguay
Uruguay national rugby union team
Uruguay national rugby sevens team

External links
  Unión de Rugby del Uruguay - Official Site
Old Christians Club Uruguay - Old Christians Club Official Site
Noticias del rugby sudamericano y de Los Teros - El Rugbier

Rugby union in Uruguay
Rugby union governing bodies in South America
Rug
Sports organizations established in 1951
World Rugby members
1951 establishments in Uruguay